The 2021–22 Miami Hurricanes women's basketball team represented the University of Miami during the 2021–22 NCAA Division I women's basketball season. The Hurricanes were led by seventeenth-year head coach Katie Meier and played their home games at the Watsco Center as members of the Atlantic Coast Conference.

The Hurricanes finished the season 21–13 overall and 10–8 in ACC play to finish in a tie for seventh place.  As the seventh seed in the ACC tournament, they defeated tenth seed Duke in the Second Round, second seeded Louisville in the Quarterfinals, and third seed Notre Dame in the Semifinals before losing to NC State in the Final.  They received an at-large bid to the NCAA tournament where they were the eighth seed in the  Greensboro Regional.  They defeated ninth seed South Florida in the First Round before losing to top seed South Carolina in the Second Round to end their season.

Previous season

The Hurricanes finished the season 11–11 and 8–10 in ACC play to finish in a tie for ninth place.  As the tenth seed in the ACC tournament, they lost to Virginia Tech in the Second Round.  They were not invited to the NCAA tournament or the WNIT.

Off-season

Departures

Incoming Transfers

Recruiting Class

Source:

Roster

Schedule

Source

|-
!colspan=6 style="background:#005030; color:#F47321;"| Regular season

|-
!colspan=6 style="background:#005030; color:#F47321;"| ACC Women's Tournament

|-
!colspan=6 style=| NCAA Women's Tournament

Rankings

The Coaches Poll releases a final poll after the NCAA tournament, but the AP Poll does not release a poll at this time.  The Coaches Poll does not release a week 2 poll.

References

Miami Hurricanes women's basketball seasons
Miami
Miami Hurricanes women's basketball team
Miami Hurricanes women's basketball team
Miami